The Working Women's Union (abbreviated UFM) was a women's organization in interbellum Romania, and the women's wing of the Social Democratic Party of Romania. As of 1947, UFM claimed to have 123,561 members.

References

Women's wings of political parties
Political organizations based in Romania
Women's organizations based in Romania